Thoovalsparsham is a 1990 Indian Malayalam-language film directed by Kamal and written by Kaloor Dennis. The film stars Jayaram, Mukesh, Sai Kumar and Suresh Gopi. It was inspired by the 1987 American film Three Men and a Baby, which itself was based on the 1985 French film Three Men and a Cradle. Thoovalsparsham was remade in Telugu in 1990 as Chinnari Muddula Papa and twice in Tamil - in 1991 as Thayamma and in 2001 as Asathal.

Plot 

Three bachelors Unnikrishnan, Boney and Vinod. They drink frequently, of which their brahmin neighbour Ananthapadmanabhan complains. One day, while Boney is away, Unnikrishnan and Vinod find a baby girl on their doorstep, with a note asking them to care for the child. They manage to cover it up and suspect that it is an illegitimate child of Boney. When Boney returns, they give him the child and lock themselves up in their room. Boney confesses that he has never had any such affair with a woman and they conclude that the girl is an orphan, but no orphanage accepts her. They try to abandon the child but fail. They hand her to a man who claims he will take her to Germany, only to find out that he is a fraud. They fight him and get the baby back. They appoint a babysitter.

An old man visits saying that the child is the illegitimate daughter of his daughter Maya and Ananthapadmanabhan, whom they had believed to be completely innocent. Maya wants her daughter desperately, but the trio are unwilling to return her. The trio uncover surprising secrets about the relationship between Ananthapadmanabhan and Maya, which later broke. After a lot of disturbance from Maya and her father, they reluctantly return the child on a condition that Maya and Ananthapadmanabhan must live together with the child, and end up dull and depressed.

Cast 

Jayaram as Unnikrishnan
Mukesh as Boney
Sai Kumar as Vinod
Suresh Gopi as Ananda Padmanabhan
Baby Farzeena Bai as Kingini
Urvashi as Maya, Kingini's Real Mother.
Ranjini as Sujatha, Unnikrishnan's love interest
Innocent as Shishubalan, Kingini's Babysitter.
Mamukoya as Moosaka
Oduvil Unnikrishnan as Unnithan
Valsala Menon as Unnithan's wife
Santhakumari
Sukumari as Ananda Padmanabhan's Mother
Bahadoor as Maya's Father
James as Child Broker

Soundtrack 
The film's soundtrack contains 4 songs, all composed by Ouseppachan and Lyrics by Kaithapram.

Remakes

References

External links
 
 Thoovalsparsham (1990)

1990s Malayalam-language films
1990 comedy films
1990 films
Indian remakes of French films
Malayalam films remade in other languages
Films scored by Ouseppachan
Films directed by Kamal (director)